Paul Mantee (born Paul Marianetti; January 9, 1931 – November 7, 2013) was an American film and television actor.

Biography

Mantee was born Paul Marianetti in San Francisco, California. A journalism major at San Mateo Junior College, Mantee enlisted in the U.S. Navy for four years during the Korean War that made him decide on acting as a career. He graduated from the University of California, Berkeley.

His stage name was changed from an Italian-sounding name to the name of Humphrey Bogart's character in The Petrified Forest. He made a great number of guest appearances in well-known television shows and starred in a handful of films, including a cult classic, Robinson Crusoe on Mars. Mantee authored two novels, In Search of the Perfect Ravioli (Ballantine Books, 1991) and a semi-autobiographical Bruno of Hollywood (Ballantine Books, 1994).

Mantee, a longtime Malibu resident, died November 7, 2013 at a rehabilitation center in Canoga Park, California. He was survived by his wife, Suzy Davis Mantee whom he met while standing in line at the Malibu post office.

Complete filmography

Partial TV credits

References

External links
 
 Paul Mantee at Allmovie
 Notice of death 

1931 births
2013 deaths
20th-century American novelists
20th-century American male writers
American male film actors
American male television actors
American male novelists
Male actors from San Francisco
Writers from San Francisco
College of San Mateo alumni
United States Navy personnel of the Korean War